Leroy Morney (May 13, 1909 – March 23, 1979) was an American baseball shortstop in the Negro leagues. He played from 1929 to 1944 with several teams. He was selected to three East-West All-Star Games.

Playing career
Morney started his Negro league career with the Memphis Red Sox (playing in the one-time major status Negro Southern League) in 1932 at the age of 23. He led the league in numerous categories: games (51), runs (49), hits (76), doubles (twelve), batting average (.378), and on-base percentage (.427). He played with three different teams the following year in the newly formed Negro National League (Columbus, Homstead, and Cleveland). He played in 23 games and batted .376 while being named to the East-West All-Star Game. He batted .237 for Pittsburgh in 1934 and followed it with a .381 season in 1935 with 23 games. He never hit as high again, batting as low as .154 in 1940 and as high as .277 in 1939 (eleven games), although he did make two more All-Star Games before he retired in 1944.

References

External links
 and Baseball-Reference Black Baseball and Mexican League stats and Seamheads

1909 births
1980 deaths
African-American baseball players
American expatriate baseball players in Mexico
Baltimore Elite Giants players
Baseball players from Columbus, Ohio
Birmingham Black Barons players
Chicago American Giants players
Cincinnati Clowns players
Cleveland Giants players
Columbus Blue Birds players
Columbus Elite Giants players
Homestead Grays players
Industriales de Monterrey players
Monroe Monarchs players
New York Black Yankees players
People from Oak Forest, Illinois
Philadelphia Stars players
Pittsburgh Crawfords players
Shreveport Black Sports players
Toledo Crawfords players
Washington Elite Giants players
20th-century African-American sportspeople
Baseball infielders